Armand Lucien Bloch (1 July 1866, Montbéliard - 5 March 1932, Paris) was a French sculptor.

Life and work 
His father, Maurice Bloch, was a sculptor, who established a metal casting company in 1857. He entered the École des Beaux-Arts in 1884, where he studied with the sculptors Alexandre Falguière and Antonin Mercié. From 1885, he was regular exhibitor at the Salon des Artistes Français, and was a member from 1888 until his death. He was awarded a silver medal there in 1924.

His studio was in Paris, but he maintained close ties with Montbéliard, where his brothers Léon and Julien had taken over the family business. Together with his father, he created a monument for the politician, Pierre-Frédéric Dorian; inaugurated in 1892. It was melted down in 1942, under the Vichy Régime.

In 1900, he obtained a silver medal at the Exposition Universelle. It too was melted down during World War II. In 2001, a replacement was installed.

References

Further reading 
 Biography and appreciation by Clementine Delplancq, from Les Cahiers de l’École du Louvre, 2015, @ De Artibus Sequanis

External links 

 Armand Bloch @ Fonte d'art à Montbeliard

1866 births
1932 deaths
French sculptors
Artists from Montbéliard